Carex hirta, the hairy sedge or hammer sedge, is a species of sedge native across Europe. It has characteristic hairy leaves and inflorescences, and is the type species of the genus Carex.

Description

The stems are trigonous (roughly triangular in cross-section), but with convex, rounded faces. The leaves, leaf sheaths and ligules are all hairy, although plants growing in wetter positions may be less hairy; these have sometimes been separated as C. hirta var. sublaevis by Jens Wilken Hornemann, but this may not be a worthwhile taxon. The hairy utricles, male glumes and leaves make it hard to confuse Carex hirta with any other Carex species.

Distribution
Carex hirta is native to Europe, and is found across the British Isles, albeit with records becoming very scarce in the far north. It has been introduced to North America. It was first recorded in Amherst, Massachusetts in 1877, and has since been found across much of the eastern United States and Canada.

Nomenclature
Carex hirta is the type species of the genus Carex, and therefore also of the subgenus Carex and the section Carex. It was described by Carl Linnaeus in his 1753 Species Plantarum, and the lectotype, from the herbarium of Adriaan van Royen, was designated by Ilkka Kukkonen in 1992.

References

hirta
Flora of Europe
Flora of North America
Plants described in 1753
Taxa named by Carl Linnaeus